Svartklubben is a Swedish lighthouse located on a small island east of the island Singö in the province of Uppland.

This massive lighthouse was constructed to carry a coal fire. In 1842 it was updated with a colza oil lamp and in 1849 parabolic mirrors were installed. In 1875 it was updated with a kerosene lamp, and in 1899 the current lens and lantern were installed. It got a gas mantle light in 1935, and was finally electrified and automated in 1961. The keeper's house is now sold as a private residence, but the Swedish Maritime Administration still owns and maintains the lighthouse.

The lighthouse has been a listed building in Sweden since 1935.

See also

 List of lighthouses and lightvessels in Sweden

References

 
 https://web.archive.org/web/20120314190711/http://www.fyr.org/indexe.htm

External links
 Sjofartsverket  
 The Swedish Lighthouse Society

Lighthouses completed in 1820
Lighthouses in Sweden